Royce Davis Purinton (October 27, 1877 – March 25, 1919) was an American football coach. He served as the head football coach at Bates College in 1902 and from 1904 to 1917.

Purinton died of heart failure, on March 25, 1919, in Lewiston, Maine.

References

External links
 

1877 births
1919 deaths
Bates Bobcats athletic directors
Bates Bobcats football coaches
Bates College alumni
People from Sagadahoc County, Maine
Coaches of American football from Maine